Anurudha Bandara Ratnayake (Sinhalese: අනුරුද්ධ බණ්ඩාර රත්නායක; Tamil: அனுருத பண்டார ரத்னாயகே; born 17 August 1975) is an Olympic boxer from Sri Lanka who lost his first match at the 2008 Summer Olympics in the flyweight division. He lost this game to Robenílson Vieira de Jesus from Brazil. See Boxing at the 2008 Summer Olympics – Flyweight

External links
 
Olympics

1975 births
Living people
People from Kandy District
Boxers at the 2008 Summer Olympics
Flyweight boxers
Olympic boxers of Sri Lanka
Sri Lankan male boxers
Boxers at the 2002 Asian Games
Boxers at the 2014 Commonwealth Games
Commonwealth Games competitors for Sri Lanka
Asian Games competitors for Sri Lanka
20th-century Sri Lankan people
21st-century Sri Lankan people